Ray Burdis (born 23 August 1958 in London) is an English actor, screenwriter, director and film producer.

Biography
Burdis started acting at eleven years old when he attended drama school and trained at the Anna Scher Theatre in Islington, Greater London. He appeared in an episode of the classic BBC sitcom Steptoe and Son when he was fifteen, but his first major role was at the age of sixteen, in the Thames Television series You Must Be Joking! , which he also co-created and wrote. He also starred with Phil Daniels in Four Idle Hands.

In 1978 Burdis auditioned for a presenting job on the BBC children's program Blue Peter as a replacement for John Noakes. Richard Marson's book celebrating the show's fiftieth-anniversary records this fact, and the film of the audition was shown at a BAFTA celebration in October 2008.

Burdis played the part of cowardly inmate Eckersley in the controversial movie Scum in 1979. He had played the same role two years earlier in a BBC television version of the story, although this was not transmitted for many years due to its graphic nature, hence the cinematic re-make.
He appeared in Mary's Wife in 1980.
Burdis appeared in the Minder episodes "Not a Bad Lad, Dad" and "Hypnotising Rita" and played Joe in the musical drama The Music Machine (1979). He later had a small role alongside Daniel Day-Lewis in the film Gandhi (1982).

Burdis then played a supporting role as Richard, a gay neighbour in Channel 4's short-lived sitcom Dream Stuffing in 1984. After this, he played ambitious photographer Nick Tyler in the BBC comedy Three Up, Two Down. His character was the son and son-in-law, respectively, of the two lead characters, played by Michael Elphick and Angela Thorne. The series rated over 17 million viewers and went on for 4 series. Also in 1984, Burdis appeared in an episode of The Gentle Touch, entitled 'Do It Yourself, as a man with a learning disability.

He went forward to produce the feature films The Passion of Darkly Noon, starring  Brendan Fraser - Ashley Judd and The Reflecting Skin starring  Viggo Mortensen - Lindsay Duncan.

Burdis has subsequently concentrated more on writing, producing and directing. He was the producer of The Krays (1990), and also co-wrote-produced and directed the movies Final Cut (1998) and Love, Honour and Obey (2000). He also created, co-wrote, produced, directed and starred in the television police fly on the wall docu-comedy Operation Good Guys for three series. The series was awarded the Silver Rose for Best Sitcom and the Prix de la Presse, voted for by the International Press, at the Montreux Golden Rose Festival.

He appeared in the BBC Two comedy-drama series Manchild for two seasons, along with Nigel Havers, Anthony Head, and Don Warrington.

In 2013 Ray Burdis wrote and directed the film, The Wee Man starring Martin Compston and John Hannah, which won two Scottish BAFTAs. In 2014 Ray wrote and directed the film 'Angel'  released in the spring of 2015 by Carnaby Films.
Ray is currently developing a wide genre of TV and Theatrical films. To Be Someone (film), described in IMDb as "A lighthearted adventure movie set in the world of Mods", was shot in Oct of 2020 and is to be released in 2021. He also has completed the film Miss The Kiss, starring Charlie Clapham, John Hannah, and Martin Kemp, to be released in the spring of 2023.

External links
 http://www.boredteenagers.co.uk/GREAT%20BRITISH%20HEROES.htm   G B H Rock band

References 

People from Islington (district)
1958 births
Living people
English male television actors
English male film actors
English film producers
English screenwriters
English male screenwriters
Alumni of the Anna Scher Theatre School